Lost Themes Remixed is a remix album of songs from the album Lost Themes (2015) by the American film director and composer John Carpenter. It was released on October 16, 2015, through Sacred Bones Records.

Track listing

References

External links
 

2015 remix albums
John Carpenter albums
Sacred Bones Records albums